McGill's Bus Services is a bus operator based in Greenock, Scotland. The company has grown to operate a network of routes covering much of Inverclyde, East Renfrewshire, Renfrewshire, North Lanarkshire, Glasgow City, North Ayrshire, West Lothian, Falkirk and Dundee. McGill's have several depots based in Greenock, Inchinnan, Johnstone, Edinburgh, Bannockburn, Balfron, Livingston and Dundee. McGill's also formerly had depots in Dumbarton, Barrhead and Coatbridge.

McGill's is the largest independent bus operator in the United Kingdom, as well as being named a Scottish Insider top 500 company in January 2016, coming in at 350th place.

History

Prehistory and early years (1933-2004)
The name "McGill's Bus Services" first came into use in 1933. This company was based in Barrhead and was owned by the McGill family. It expanded significantly during the years leading up to bus deregulation, but in July 1997, sold out to the major operator in the area, Clydeside 2000, in the face of significant competition from independent minibus operators. McGill's initially retained its identity, but was later rebranded as Arriva Scotland West. Another company, Greenock based Ashton Coaches (trading as GMS), was also acquired by Clydeside in the same month.

In July 2001, Arriva decided to withdraw from its Inverclyde operations, which were loss-making and was facing significant competition from independent operators. Its Greenock depot was sold to former GMS owner Alex Kean and the Easdale family with each owning 50%. Arriva had retained a separate operating licence for McGill's, and this was used as the basis for the sale. The McGill's Bus Services name was revived by the new company and a new livery of blue, white, and gold was introduced. The fleet initially consisted of 33 Mercedes-Benz minibuses hired from Arriva; services were operated from a large depot on the Easdale Industrial Estate.

Early in its existence the new company began operating services in competition with Harte Buses, and in September 2004 Harte withdrew from two routes leaving McGill's as the sole operator.

In October 2004, Kean sold his shares in the company to the Easdale family, who quickly replaced the hired minibuses with new low-floor vehicles, leading to increases in passenger numbers.

Consolidation & expansion (2005-2015)

Between 2005 and 2008, McGill's introduced a number of new longer-distance routes connecting Inverclyde and Glasgow to Largs, and in May 2005, began operating a series of day excursions branded as Smoothiecruisers. In July 2008, McGill's purchased the stage carriage routes and goodwill of four routes centred on Greenock which had previously been run by Slaemuir Coaches.

In the same month, the firm established a second depot in Barrhead on the site of the garage used by the original McGill's Bus Services, which had been vacated by Arriva in 2002.

The new operation traded as United Buses using Greenock and District Omnibuses Greenock and District Omnibus Limited o'licence with vehicles on hire from ABC Taxis ABC Taxis (Inverclyde) Limited which also had an o'licence and capitalised on the revocation of the operating licences held by local operator John Walker to move onto four routes previously served by his group of companies.

Twenty step-entrance buses were initially used, but these were largely replaced by low-floor vehicles after four months. The United name was replaced by that of McGill's in September 2009; the same month saw the company introducing the express service X23 between Glasgow and Erskine. By the beginning of 2010, McGill's had become the largest independent bus operator in Scotland, and the fourth largest operator of any type.

A new service linking Greenock and Larkfield was introduced in early 2010 to replace a route withdrawn by Wilson's Coaches. May 2010 saw McGill's expand its services from Dunoon and Greenock to Braehead to cover for the withdrawal of Harte Buses' Braehead Express. In July 2010, the company was fined £60,000 by the Traffic Commissioner for failing to operate some services as timetabled, although it was permitted to expand its fleet from 110 to 150 vehicles. The Smoothiecrusisers network was withdrawn in August 2010.

The company acquired the operations and vehicles of large independent operator Gibson's Direct in September 2010, expanding the size of its fleet by around 70%.

In February 2011, two small operators based in the Paisley area, Fairway Coaches and Travel Direct, were purchased by McGill's, although no vehicles were acquired. 
Two further acquisitions, of Renfrewshire-based Ferenze Travel and Phoenix Travel, were announced in March 2011. In the same month, Dickson's of Erskine sold its key route 38, a Glasgow to Paisley service operated in competition with both Arriva Scotland West and First Glasgow, to McGill's, who converted the route to low-floor operation and increased its frequency at a cost of £1.5 million.

In March 2012, McGill's purchased the remaining Arriva Scotland West operation. The sale included 165 vehicles, 380 staff, and depots at Inchinnan and Johnstone. The deal expanded the McGill's a fleet to over 350 buses.

On 15 October 2012, it was announced that McGill's were to acquire the local bus services of Balloch-based McColls Coaches for £3 million, with 30 buses joining the fleet. In June 2013, four new routes in the Paisley area were introduced by the company to replace those of Riverside Transport.

In January 2014, McGill's was linked with a bid to operate the 360-bus network on the Mediterranean island of Malta following the end of Arriva's operations there. A month later, the company pulled out of the bid citing a lack of transparency on the part of the island's government.

In October 2014 McGill's Coaches bought Henderson Travel after it suddenly ceased business.which has resulted in the company expanding in North Lanarkshire and becoming the dominant operator in the Monklands area by early 2016.

Back in Scotland, an open-top tour of Inverclyde was introduced in April 2015.

Lanarkshire expansion (2016-2020)
In the summer of 2015, the company announced its plans to double in size by 2020. Sandy Easdale said: "It's all about growth and now that were moving forward since the Competition Commission it's about growing McGill's. That's the aim - in the next 5 years' double everything. We are looking at expanding in Lanarkshire in the near future and we are in discussions with some smaller companies to be buying them out in the area and that will join into McGill's. But the good thing about it is that every time McGill's grows outside the area it actually employs people in the Greenock Head Office. It's all about employment. It would be easy to move our head office elsewhere but we stay in Greenock and we're great supporters of the local economy. We're concentrating on our own things and growing our business organically."

On 20 January 2016, McGill's announced its first acquisition in Monklands area of Lanarkshire, when a deal was reached to purchase the bus routes of McNairn Coaches and JJ Travel for an undisclosed sum. The deal included 14 members of staff and a number of vehicles. On 2 February 2015, a second acquisition was made with the routes of Arthur's Coaches and D.A. Coaches being bought out along with three vehicles.
On 30 May 2016, McGills purchased the routes and local service vehicles of Silverdale Coaches. On 29 August 2016, the company moved premises from a depot in Blantyre Industrial Estate near Hamilton, South Lanarkshire Hamilton to a new fully refurbished facility in Coatbridge with all services and buses from the Hamilton depot transferring to the new facility. A number of revisions were introduced to the Monklands services from this date improving services and connections for passengers.

Xplore Dundee & First Scotland East acquisitions (2021-)
On 1 January 2021, McGill's purchased Xplore Dundee and Xplore More from National Express. The business continues to trade under the Xplore Dundee brand for bus travel and Xplore More for coach travel. The sale involved 350 employees and a fleet of 120 buses at the time.

On 6 September 2022, it was announced that McGill's had acquired the operations of First Scotland East from the FirstGroup. The company was rebranded to McGill's Scotland East, also trading as McGill's Midland Bluebird and McGill's Eastern Scottish. The sale, completed on 19 September 2022, saw McGill's take on 550 employees, four depots and a fleet of 257 buses from the FirstGroup, including the Bright Bus Tours open top bus tour operation in Edinburgh. Following the takeover, 120 of the buses acquired from First were deemed unsuitable for McGill's service and taken off the road, with some returning to service after repairs and some being replaced by vehicles transferred from other McGill's operations.

Ownership and management
McGill's Bus Services was initially owned by Alex Kean and the Easdale family with each owning 50%. In October 2004, Kean sold his 50% share to the Easdale family. Managed by brothers James and Sandy Easdale, they also own a number of taxi firms in the Inverclyde region, as well as several non-transport businesses.

Former Arriva Scotland West managing director Ralph Roberts joined McGill's in March 2010. General manager Bert Hendry and finance director Graeme Davidson retained their positions, while James Easdale became the firm's chairman. Colin Napier, who had previously worked for Coakley Bus & Coach and McKindless, became the company's area manager for its eastern operations in August 2010. Napier has since been appointed to Head of Operations & Commercial.

Fleet

As of January 2021 the fleet consists of 441 buses.

McGill's was formed with a fleet of 33 Mercedes-Benz minibuses hired from their former owner Arriva Scotland West. Many of these vehicles were previously used by Ashton Coaches and were quickly repainted from their previous green and gold or aquamarine colour schemes into the McGill's blue, white, and gold livery. The minibuses began to be replaced following the Easdale family's acquisition of McGill's in 2004, and a large number of new low-floor buses were bought over the following years as the company expanded, initially Dennis Dart SLFs and DAF SB120s. A rare Hispano bodied Volvo B7L was acquired from Arriva Midlands; later deliveries of new vehicles included Alexander Dennis Enviro200 Darts, Alexander Dennis Enviro300s Mercedes-Benz Citaros, Volvo B7RLEs and Scania L94UBs.

The United operation in Renfrewshire began in 2008 with second-hand step-entrance Darts; these were quickly replaced by low-floor vehicles, with the depot becoming 100% low-floor by September 2009. A number of Caetano bodied Dart SLFs were bought from Bluestar in 2009 for use on new route X23.

A small number of coaches were operated on route 907, which used the Western Ferries service to Dunoon and required vehicles with ferry lift facilities and low rear overhang. An articulated Volvo B7LA was tested as a means of increasing capacity on services to Glasgow in early 2010, but did not prove successful. Double-deck operation was first tried in November 2009, when an Alexander Dennis Enviro400 was briefly used on route X7. Although no such vehicles were purchased, the trial prompted the company to buy two Volvo B7TLs from London United in autumn 2010 for use on the same route. These were quickly followed by 12 Alexander bodied Dennis Tridents new to Metroline in London.

Modern vehicles inherited into the fleet following the purchase of Arriva Scotland West included six Scania OmniLink and ten VDL SB200/Wright Pulsar. In July 2012, six articulated Mercedes-Benz Citaros were acquired for service 38. A further eight Tridents arrived from London United, along with a batch of at least ten from Stagecoach London. The number of low floor double deck vehicles introduced to the fleet since the purchase of Arriva stands at around 40. Along with an unknown number of further Mercedes-Benz Citaros articulated buses for the Dumbarton area - Glasgow services, these continue to displace elderly vehicles from the former Arriva fleet.

In 2014 McGill's purchased one of the Alexander Dennis Enviro 400s that they had trialled back in 2009, which had been operated by Connex of Jersey before the purchase. Thirteen new Mercedes-Benz Citaros were also acquired for the Glasgow to Greenock routes.

In late 2015, the company bought eight second-hand DAF double deckers from Ensign.

In 2016, McGill's purchased a large number of second hand Alexander Dennis Enviro 200s to operate their new Lanarkshire network.

This was complemented by a Wright StreetLite, two BMCs, and a number of Optare Solos which were added to the fleet as a result of the acquisition of Silverdale Coaches. The company has also added a further three second hand Wright StreetLites to the Greenock depot and is awaiting delivery of two Mellor Coachcraft Strata vehicles which are to be operated by Greenock depot.

In November 2021, McGill's took delivery of 55 Yutong E12 battery electric buses. 41 more electric Yutong buses, 31 of these being E12s and the remaining ten being shorter E10s, have been ordered for delivery in early 2023, which will result in McGill's operating a total fleet of 96 Yutong buses.

References

External links

Company website

Bus operators in Scotland
Transport companies established in 2001
Companies based in Inverclyde